Hogan Preparatory Academy is a charter school at 1221 East Meyer Boulevard  in Kansas City, Missouri. Although a public school it is not part of the Kansas City, Missouri School District since it is a charter school. As of March 2022 it had an enrollment of 450 making it the 176th largest high school in Missouri. It has 17 teachers. The school in March 2022 had an enrollment that was 97.6 percent African American. The school colors are Orange , Grey and Maroon. and the mascot is the Ram.

History
The school started as a Catholic high school in 1942 and was named for John Joseph Hogan, the first Bishop of the Diocese of Kansas City. In 1999 it became a charter school.

Athletics
The school won its first state championship in boys' basketball in 2011 and won again in 2018.

State Championships

Notable alumni
Class of 1948 - Joseph Hubert Hart, Catholic bishop
Class of 1951 - Dolores Michaels, actress
Class of 1969 - Sly James, Kansas City mayor
Class of 2008 - Marcus Denmon, basketball player
Class of 2011 - De'Vante Bausby, American football player
Class of 2016 - William Bradley-King, American football player

References

External links
hoganprep.echalk.com

High schools in Kansas City, Missouri
Educational institutions established in 1935
Public high schools in Missouri
Charter schools in Missouri
1935 establishments in Missouri